Bellas de noche (in English Beauties by Night), also known as Las ficheras, is a Mexican film directed by Miguel M. Delgado. It was filmed in 1975 and starring Sasha Montenegro and Jorge Rivero. It is regarded as the film that began the rise of Mexican sex comedies film genre as a largely mainstream genre in the Mexican Cinema for about a decade and a half; the term "fichera" coming to mean the entire genre.

Plot
The Boxer Germán Bronco Torres (Jorge Rivero) loses his license, and works as bouncer at the cabaret El Pirulí (The Lollipop), where he falls for the fichera Carmen (Sasha Montenegro), and befriends the pimp Margarito Fuensanta 'El Vaselinas' (Eduardo de la Peña), who lost a bet and has to pay it to some gangsters. For 500 pesos for 'El Vaselinas', 'Bronco' prepares a trap in the cabaret to the taxi driver Raul (Enrique Novi), to seduce his girlfriend, not knowing that the victim is his own sister Lupita (Leticia Perdigón). When he discovers the situation, he hits the driver and send him to prison. Raúl sold his taxi so He can pay bail. El Vaselinas pretends to be dead in order to get rid of his creditors. The cabaret is closed and everybody begins a new life. In the adventures of these characters, appended the alcoholic woman known as La Corcholata (Carmen Salinas), a sympathetic woman trying to sneak to the cabaret, and the history of the owner of the cabaret, Don Atenógenes (Raúl 'Chato' Padilla), and his wife, the mistress of the brothel, Maria Teresa (Rosa Carmina).

Production
The film is an adaptation of the stage play by Francisco Cavazos Las ficheras. In 1975, the film packed the movie theaters in Mexico City for 26 weeks. It was a production of Cinematográfica Calderón and was directed by Miguel M. Delgado. The Mexican Government censorship prohibited the previous title of the film (Fichera is a derogatory way of calling a cabaret woman in Mexico). Therefore, as a "tribute" to Luis Buñuel, the screenwriter Victor Manuel Castro took the title of the film Belle de Jour.

Cast
 Sasha Montenegro as Carmen
 Jorge Rivero as Germán "Bronco" Torres
 Rosa Carmina as María Teresa
 Raúl 'Chato' Padilla as Don Atenógenes
 Leticia Perdigón as Lupita
 Carmen Salinas as La Corcholata
 Enrique Novi as Raúl
 Eduardo de la Peña as El Vaselinas
 Mabel Luna as La Muñeca
 Víctor Manuel Castro as Fabián
 Rafael Inclán as El MovidAS

References

External links
 
 Bellas de noche on FilmAffinity
 Bellas de noche on IMCINE

1975 films
1970s sex comedy films
1970s Spanish-language films
Sexploitation films
Mexican sex comedy films
1975 comedy films
Films directed by Miguel M. Delgado
1970s Mexican films